This page lists the World Best Year Performances in the year 2002 in the Marathon for both men and women. One of the main title events during this season were the 2002 European Athletics Championships in Munich, Germany. The world record was broken in both the men's and the women's competition.

Men

Records

2002 World Year Ranking

Women

Records

2002 World Year Ranking

References
2002 Marathon Ranking by the ARRS
IAAF (men)
IAAF (women)

2002
 Marathon